The Aroma of Tea is a 2006 Dutch animated short film  written and directed by Michaël Dudok de Wit. It shows how a small sphere travels in a determined and rhythmical manner through land-scapes, emerging at the end into a larger sphere of white light. Both the graphic brushstroke and the music, with its haunting rhythms, are strikingly simple and direct. The theme of the film, a quest followed by a union, is as old as time and recognizable despite its limitless variations.

External links
BFI 50th London Film Festival

2000s animated short films
2006 films
Dutch animated short films
2006 short films
Films directed by Michaël Dudok de Wit